Basil Joseph is an Indian film director and actor who works in the Malayalam film industry. He directed three films, Kunjiramayanam (2015), Godha (2017) and Minnal Murali (2021). All three films were a huge success both commercially and critically. Besides direction, Basil is also an actor and has acted in numerous films.

He started his career as an assistant director of Vineeth Sreenivasan in the 2013 film Thira. His acting debut was through the 2013 film Up & Down: Mukalil Oralundu directed by T.K. Rajeev Kumar.

Career 
Basil Joseph began his career in 2012 as an actor in the short film CET Life during his engineering days at College of Engineering, Trivandrum. He has also scripted and directed the short films, with Albert S Oru Thundu Padam and Priyamvadha Katharayano during his stint at Infosys, Trivandrum.

Basil started his career in the Malayalam film industry by assisting Vineeth Sreenivasan in his third directional venture, Thira in 2013. His directorial debut was in 2015 with Kunjiramayanam which had malayalam film actor brothers Vineeth Sreenivasan and Dhyan Sreenivasan acting together for the first time. The movie narrated the tale of people from a quaint imaginary village called 'Desom' where myths, legends and superstitions play a major part in their life. The film became a commercial success at the box office among 2015 Malayalam film onam releases. Basil Joseph's second directorial venture Godha was a sports comedy movie pivoted around wrestling got released in 2017 which had Punjabi actress Wamiqa Gabbi acting debut in Malayalam film. The movie was a commercial success and went on to become the highest grossing film of Tovino Thomas during that period. His third film Minnal Murali has Tovino Thomas plays the role of a homegrown hero with superpowers. The movie, which was announced in 2020 and released on Netflix India on 24 December 2021, was the first-ever superhero film of the malayalam film industry and had a simultaneous release in Malayalam, Tamil, Telugu, Kannada and Hindi languages.

Basil Joseph made his acting debut in 2013 Malayalam film Up & Down: Mukalil Oralundu and has played various supporting actor roles around 18 Malayalam movies till date.

Personal life
Basil is an alumnus of College of Engineering, Trivandrum.
On 17 August 2017, Basil married Elizabeth Samuel, with whom he was in a relationship for over seven years. They have one daughter .

Filmography

Feature films 
 All films are in Malayalam language unless otherwise noted.

As director

As assistant director
 Thira (2013)

As actor

Short films

Awards and nominations

References

External links
 

Living people
People from Wayanad district
Film directors from Kerala
Indian male film actors
Male actors from Kerala
Male actors in Malayalam cinema
Malayalam film directors
Malayalam screenwriters
21st-century Indian male actors
Screenwriters from Kerala
Year of birth missing (living people)
Place of birth missing (living people)